William Hill (11 June 1945 – 27 July 2020) was a Hong Kong sprinter. He competed in the men's 200 and 400 metres at the 1964 Summer Olympics. He was a 1964 graduate of the Diocesan Boys' School.

References

External links
 

1945 births
2020 deaths
Athletes (track and field) at the 1964 Summer Olympics
Hong Kong male sprinters
Olympic athletes of Hong Kong
Place of birth missing